The Second Congregational Church in New York, organized in 1825, was a Unitarian congregation which had three permanent homes in Manhattan, New York City, the second of which became a theater after they left it. In 1919 the congregation joined the Community Church Movement and changed its name to Community Church of New York. The same year its church, on 34th Street, was damaged by fire. Since 1948 the congregation has been located at 40 East 35th Street.

Origins
The first Unitarian Society in New York was founded May 24, 1819, and incorporated on November 15th under the name "First Congregational Church in the City of New York" (later "Unitarian Church of All Souls"), although there had been between three and five Congregational churches in the city before that. On January 20, 1821, the congregation dedicated a newly built church on Chambers Street, west of Church Street.

By 1825, the church had become crowded, and many of the pew holders lived above Canal Street. A meeting was held March 19 of persons disposed to unite in building a church there for Unitarian worship, and "The Second Congregational Unitarian Society" was formed.  They built a church on the northwest corner of Prince and Mercer Streets, opening on December 7, 1826. William Ellery Channing preached a sermon and William Cullen Bryant, a member of the congregation, wrote a hymn for the occasion. Designed by Josiah R. Brady, the edifice was one of the earliest Greek Revival buildings in New York.

Orville Dewey became pastor in 1835, a position he held until 1848. During his tenure, on November 26, 1837, the church building was completely destroyed by fire. The congregation took temporary quarters until May 2, 1839, when their new church, which they called Church of the Messiah, opened for worship at 728–30 Broadway, opposite Waverly Place.

In January 1865 that church was sold to department store magnate A. T. Stewart and converted into a theater, which subsequently operated under a series of names, including Globe Theatre, and ending with New Theatre Comique. It burned down in 1884.

34th Street
The congregation's third church, on 34th Street at the northwest corner of Fourth (Park) Avenue, was inaugurated in 1867. It was designed in Victorian Romanesque style by Carl Pfeiffer.

On May 25, 1919, Rev. John Haynes Holmes, minister from 1907 to 1949, announced the church's change of name to Community Church of New York. He explained:

I have left Unitarianism, cut myself off from all denominational connections of every kind, that I may preach a universal, humanistic religion which knows no bounds of any kind, not even Christianity. We have … placed the support of the church on the … basis of free voluntary subscriptions. We have rewritten our covenant, eliminating every last vestige of theology, thus relegating all matters of belief to private individual opinion. … [Any person] is welcome to our church, whether he be rich or poor, black or white, Christian, Jew, Hindu, or Parsee.

In 2019, Community Church of New York, called their first woman to the position of Senior Minister, Rev. Peggy Clarke.

References

External links

 
 

Churches in Manhattan
Building and structure fires in New York City
Church fires in the United States
Demolished churches in New York City
Demolished buildings and structures in Manhattan
Churches completed in 1826
Churches completed in 1839
Churches completed in 1867
1864 disestablishments in New York (state)
West Village
SoHo, Manhattan
Murray Hill, Manhattan
Gothic Revival church buildings in New York City
Greek Revival church buildings in New York City
Romanesque Revival church buildings in New York City
Victorian architecture in New York City
Broadway (Manhattan)
1825 establishments in New York (state)